Colman McCarthy (born March 24, 1938 in Glen Head, New York) is an American journalist, teacher, lecturer, pacifist, progressive, anarchist, and long-time peace activist, directs the Center for Teaching Peace in Washington, D.C. From 1969 to 1997, he wrote columns for The Washington Post. His topics ranged from politics, religion, health, and sports to education, poverty, and peacemaking. Washingtonian magazine called him "the liberal conscience of The Washington Post." Smithsonian magazine said he is "a man of profound spiritual awareness." He has written for The New Yorker, The Nation, The Progressive, The Atlantic, The New York Times, and Reader's Digest. Since 1999, he has written biweekly columns for National Catholic Reporter.

Peacework 

Since 1982, he has been teaching courses on nonviolence and the literature of peace. In the fall semester of 2006, he taught at seven schools: Georgetown University Law Center, American University, The Catholic University of America, the University of Maryland, The Washington Center for Internships, Wilson High School, Bethesda-Chevy Chase High School and School Without Walls. In 25 years, he has had more than 7,000 students in his classes. In 1985, he founded the Center for Teaching Peace, a nonprofit that helps schools begin or expand academic programs in Peace studies. He is a regular speaker at U.S. colleges, prep schools, high schools, and peace conferences, and gives an average of 50 lectures a year. The titles of his lectures range from "How To Be a Peacemaker" to "Nonviolence In a Time of War." Including lectures and interviews, McCarthy has had more than 30 appearances on C-SPAN.

For his courses on nonviolence and the literature of peace, McCarthy's course texts include "Solutions To Violence" and "Strength Through Peace: the Ideas and People of Nonviolence." Both books are anthologies of peace essays edited by McCarthy and published by the Center for Teaching Peace. The purpose of the courses is to expose students to the philosophy of pacifism and the methods of nonviolent conflict resolution. 
His former students include Rep. Jim McGovern (D-Mass.), one of the most liberal members of Congress; Mark Gearan, former president of Hobart and William Smith Colleges and also a former director of the Peace Corps; John McCarthy, director and founder of Elementary Baseball; Anthony Shriver, director and founder of Best Buddies International; Andy Shallal, founder and owner of Busboys and Poets restaurant-bookstores in DC. The advisory board of the Center for Teaching Peace includes Robert Coles, Joan Baez, Arun Gandhi, Muhammad Yunus, Sen. Ron Wyden, Marian Wright Edelman, Jack Olender, Sydney Wolfe and Ronald Dellums.

McCarthy's educational philosophy has attracted some controversy in the past, with two Bethesda-Chevy Chase High School students calling in 2006 for a more balanced presentation of the issues covered by the class. McCarthy's classes are discussion-based and well known for lively debates and challenges that McCarthy issues to his students. On many Friday mornings since 1991, he and his Peace Studies  students at Bethesda-Chevy High School have taken to the highway fronting the campus to protest the Iraq and Afghanistan wars. Students wield signs, from “Bring 'Em Home” to “Honk for Peace.”  An avid teetotaler, McCarthy often challenges his students to stop drinking alcohol for the semester and document their experiences and observations of those around them. He also lectures at many universities and institutes. In October 2009, McCarthy lectured The Politics of Peace at the New Hampshire Institute of Politics at Saint Anselm College.

Over the years, hundreds of guest speakers have spoken in his classes. They have included Nobel Peace Prize winners (Adolfo Pérez Esquivel, Muhammad Yunus and Mairead Maguire), Peace Corps volunteers, Sufi mystics, Army psychiatrists, members of Congress, school custodial workers, former death row inmates, murder victims' families, social workers, corporate executives, rabbis, priests, Special Olympics athletes, Olympic Games athletes, former political prisoners, parents, homeless individuals, folk singers, presidential candidates, and activists for human rights, civil rights, gay and lesbian rights, victims' rights, prisoners' rights, Native Americans' rights, and animal rights.

In 2009, McCarthy wrote an article in The Washington Post about the life of Thomas, a peace activist, who undertook a 27-year antinuclear vigil in front of the White House.

See also
 List of peace activists

Awards
As a pacifist, journalist, and ethical vegetarian, he was awarded the Peace Abbey Courage of Conscience Award in Sherborn, Massachusetts for his nationally syndicated column in The Washington Post.

McCarthy also won an Alicia Patterson Foundation fellowship for journalism in 1998 to research and write about mentoring, tutoring, and literacy at Garrison elementary school in Washington, D.C.

In 2010 he was awarded the El-Hibri Peace Education Prize.

He also won the

 Olender Peacemaker Award The Jack and Lovell Olender Foundation (1996)
 Pax Christi Peace Teacher Award Teachers of Peace (1993)\

Works by Colman McCarthy 
 Disturbers of the Peace: Profiles in Non Adjustment
 Inner Companions
 Pleasures of the Game
 Involvements: One Journalist's Place in the World
 All of One Peace
 I'd Rather Teach Peace
 Strength Through Peace (editor)
 Solutions to Violence (editor)
 At Rest With the Animals
 My America (contributor)
 Contemporary Anarchist Studies (contributor)
 In the Name of Profit (contributor)
 Peace Is Possible (contributor)

Film 
Colman McCarthy's son, John, has made a full-length documentary titled Bandit about his father's practice of peaceful anarchy. The film contains a wide variety of interviews Colman did that centered on his views on pacifism and animal rights. Notable examples are his discussion of Thanksgiving and a debate with Pat Buchanan. It premiered at the Avalon Theatre in Washington, D.C.

Articles about Colman McCarthy 
 The New York Times Nov. 17, 1986: Washington talk; A Skirmish Involving a Pacifist
 The Washington Post Jan. 13, 1985
 The Washington Post Jan. 12, 1997
 The Washington Post Feb. 26, 2006
 The Wall Street Journal Feb. 25, 1998
 Los Angeles Times Feb. 14, 1994
 USA Today Oct. 16, 2001
 Minneapolis Star Tribune Feb. 9, 1990
 Minneapolis Star Tribune Oct. 4, 1998
 San Diego Tribune March 12, 1988
 The Hartford Courant Oct. 3, 1990
 Greensboro News & Record Jan. 21, 1999
 Rochester Democrat and Chronicle Nov. 22, 2002
 The Progressive Nov. 1986
 The Progressive Jan. 1991
 Teacher Oct. 2003
 Vegetarian Times July 1989
 Washingtonian Feb. 2002
 Editor & Publisher Feb. 8, 1997
 Hope Magazine July/August 2003
CBS Sunday Morning November 29, 2020

References

External links

Ex-Journalist Sees Schools as Peace Training Ground
Doves and War Drums: Strong Words on Nonviolence
Teaching Nonviolence: McCarthy is interviewed on Humankind public radio

Booknotes interview with McCarthy on All of One Peace: Essays on Nonviolence, July 31, 1994.
C-SPAN Q&A interview with McCarthy, June 1, 2008

1938 births
Living people
American anti-war activists
American columnists
American pacifists
American University faculty and staff
Anarchist writers
Anarcho-pacifists
American anti-poverty advocates
Georgetown University Law Center faculty
Journalists from Alabama
People from Glen Head, New York
Spring Hill College alumni
University of Maryland, College Park alumni
American anarchists